The 1977 U.S. Women's Open was the 32nd U.S. Women's Open, held July 21–24 at Hazeltine National Golf Club in Chaska, Minnesota, a suburb southwest of Minneapolis.

Hollis Stacy led wire-to-wire and won her first major championship and the first of her three U.S. Women's Open titles, two strokes ahead of runner-up Nancy Lopez, who had recently turned  She began the final round with a one-stroke lead over Jan Stephenson, with Lopez a stroke back in third.

Seven years earlier in 1970, Hazeltine had hosted the U.S. Open, which returned in 1991. The PGA Championship was played at the course in 2002 and 2009 and the Ryder Cup in 2016.

Past champions in the field

Made the cut

Source:

Missed the cut

Source:

Final leaderboard
Sunday, July 24, 1977

Source:

References

External links
Golf Observer final leaderboard
U.S. Women's Open Golf Championship
Hazeltine National Golf Club

U.S. Women's Open
Golf in Minnesota
Sports competitions in Minnesota
Chaska, Minnesota
Women's sports in Minnesota
U.S. Women's Open
U.S. Women's Open
U.S. Women's Open
U.S. Women's Open